Anais Michel (born ) is a French weightlifter, competing in the 48 kg category and representing France at international competitions. She competed at world championships, most recently at the 2015 World Weightlifting Championships. She also competed at the 2017 European Weightlifting Championships.

She represented France at the 2020 Summer Olympics in Tokyo, Japan. She finished in 7th place in the women's 49 kg event.

Major results

References

External links
 

1988 births
Living people
French female weightlifters
Place of birth missing (living people)
Mediterranean Games silver medalists for France
Mediterranean Games medalists in weightlifting
Competitors at the 2018 Mediterranean Games
European Weightlifting Championships medalists
Weightlifters at the 2020 Summer Olympics
Olympic weightlifters of France
21st-century French women